Downtown Cairo ("middle of town"), has been the urban center of Cairo, Egypt, since the late 19th century, when the district was designed and built.

History
Downtown Cairo was designed by prestigious French architects who were commissioned by Khedive Ismail during his visit to Paris, and since then he wanted to make the Egyptian Kingdom capital better than Paris and to be the jewel of the orient. It was he who stressed the importance of European style urban planning in Cairo, to include broad, linear gridded streets, geometric harmony and modern European architectural style.

It was once home to the prosperous elite of late 19th and early 20th century Cairo. It is a relic of a bygone era — Egypt's belle epoque — and demonstrates the vision for developing Egypt. Yet decades of neglect by the neighbourhood's landlords and tenants following the burning of most of Cairo's buildings during the popular Cairo fire incident prior the 1952 Revolution led by Gamal Abdel Nasser, and the ensuing departure of the upper classes, have left the splendor of its ornate edifices mired in decay. Lax enforcement of laws and regulations gave way to the entry of commercial establishments into the neighborhood, mostly with no regard to maintaining aesthetic harmony or preserving the historic buildings of Downtown Cairo. Now, most of the historic buildings within the area were renovated by the ministry Of housing, utilities and urban development.

Downtown landmarks

Groppi
Groppi is one of the first and most famous ice cream shop in Cairo, located in Talaat Harb Square. It was founded in 1909 by the Swiss Groppi family,  survived the nationalization movement in the 1950s and 1960s, and was owned by the Groppi family until 1981 when it was bought by Abdul-Aziz Lokma.

Café Riche

One of the most renowned downtown landmarks, on the 29th of Talaat Harb Street, is the Café Riche which opened in 1908.  At various times a meeting place for intellectuals and revolutionaries, the cafe witnessed many historically significant events over the 20th century. It is said to be where King Farouk saw his second wife, Nariman Sadek; where the perpetrator of the 1919 failed assassination attempt on Egypt's last Christian Prime Minister, Youssef Wahba Pasha lay in wait for his target; and where several members of the resistance during the 1919 revolution met in the basement to organize their activities and print their flyers. Patrons included Egyptian Nobel Prize winner and nationalist novelist Naguib Mahfouz and the then-future president Gamal Abdel Nasser.

Restoration
Heritage groups have long called for a national campaign to preserve and restore the area's architectural legacy and beauty. Only since the 1992 earthquake, which caused notable damage across the city and country, did national campaigns to preserve  heritage form, such as the Historic Cairo Restoration Project.

See also

Tahrir Square
Qasr El Eyni Street

References

 
Districts of Cairo
History of Cairo